Glendale Heights is a village in DuPage County, Illinois, United States. Per the 2020 census, the population was 33,176. The village is almost entirely residential, and is a far west suburb of Chicago.

History
Glendale Heights was a small farming area served by the Glen Ellyn post office up until the 1950s, with a population of just 104 in 1959. Midland Enterprises ran by Charles and Harold Reskin started building houses in Glendale Heights in 1958.  The Reskins bought two farms on Glen Ellyn Road north of North Avenue.  Houses were first built on Glen Ellyn Road and Larry Lane near Fullerton Avenue. On June 16, 1959, a petition was filed and on July 13, the village became incorporated. The first election was held later on that summer on August 2.

The town was originally named Glendale as it was between Glen Ellyn and Bloomingdale, but after a conflict arose with the small town of Glendale in Southern Illinois, the city decided in March 1960 to add the term Heights, in reference to its different topographies, a difference of about 100 feet because of its location straddling the Valparaiso Morraine, thus becoming Glendale Heights.

Geography
Glendale Heights is located at  (41.920228, −88.078918).

Demographics

As of the 2020 census there were 33,176 people, 11,654 households, and 8,293 families residing in the village. The racial makeup of the village was 36.61% White, 7.27% African American, 1.28% Native American, 25.25% Asian, 0.10% Pacific Islander, 16.87% from other races, and 12.63% from two or more races. Hispanic or Latino of any race were 32.82% of the population.

There were 11,654 households, out of which 60.22% had children under the age of 18 living with them, 51.75% were married couples living together, 14.54% had a female householder with no husband present, and 28.84% were non-families. 21.49% of all households were made up of individuals, and 4.86% had someone living alone who was 65 years of age or older. The average household size was 3.44 and the average family size was 2.90.

The village's age distribution consisted of 23.0% under the age of 18, 9.9% from 18 to 24, 32.3% from 25 to 44, 22.3% from 45 to 64, and 12.5% who were 65 years of age or older. The median age was 34.3 years. For every 100 females, there were 99.7 males. For every 100 females age 18 and over, there were 98.3 males.

The median income for a household in the village was $70,034, and the median income for a family was $71,226. Males had a median income of $42,911 versus $30,974 for females. The per capita income for the village was $29,225. About 8.3% of families and 9.9% of the population were below the poverty line, including 18.4% of those under age 18 and 3.7% of those age 65 or over.

Note: the US Census treats Hispanic/Latino as an ethnic category. This table excludes Latinos from the racial categories and assigns them to a separate category. Hispanics/Latinos can be of any race.

Economy
According to Glendale Height's 2022 Comprehensive Annual Financial Report, the top employers in the city are:

Schools 
Glendale Heights has three school districts, 15, 16 and 41.  All of these districts are K-8 and feed into Glenbard Township district 87.  Though there are three school districts, there is only one library district, the Glenside Public Library District.  
  
Queen Bee District 16

District 16 has two schools, Glen Hill and Pheasant Ridge that are K-3.  Americana is for 4th and 5th grades.  The middle school's name is Glenside and used to be referred to as a junior high.  District 16's name sake school, Queen Bee, is no longer used as an elementary school.  The building is still standing on Bloomingdale Road and used for other purposes.  District 16 students are split between Glenbard North and Glenbard West for high school.

Marquardt District 15

District 15 has four elementary schools, G. Stanley Hall School, Winnebago School, Blackhawk School, and Charles G. Reskin School.  The middle school, Marquardt, is the district's school.  Marquardt has a separate building for the sixth grade students, and another for 7th and 8th grade students.  District 15 serves the eastern part of Glendale Heights, parts of Addison, southern section of Bloomingdale, unincorporated Lombard, and the northern part of Glen Ellyn Countryside.  Winnebago school has a Bloomingdale address, but sits very close to the Glendale Heights border.  District 15 feeds primarily into Glenbard East High School.

Glen Ellyn School District 41

District 41 has four elementary schools, Abraham Lincoln, Benjamin Franklin, Churchill and Forest Glen.  Students that live in Glendale Heights within the boundaries of District 41 attend Abraham Lincoln.  Hadley Junior High is the fifth school, and it is a separate facility for students enrolled sixth, seventh and eighth grades.  District 41 serves parts of Carol Stream, Glendale Heights, Glen Ellyn, Lombard and Wheaton.  Students that live in Glendale Heights within the boundaries of District 41 feed into Glenbard West High School.

Notable people 

 Billy Corgan, guitarist and singer of the Smashing Pumpkins, grew up in Glendale Heights.
 Jeremy Hammond, political activist, hacktivist, and anarchist, born and grew up in Glendale Heights.

References

External links

Village Website
Glenside Public Library (Public Library for Glendale Heights)

 
Villages in Illinois
Chicago metropolitan area
Villages in DuPage County, Illinois
Populated places established in 1958
1959 establishments in Illinois
Majority-minority cities and towns in DuPage County, Illinois